State Institute of Urban Planning and Architecture has been established in the year 2012 to provide quality education in the field of Architecture and Urban Planning. It is located in Rohtak, Haryana and is under the direct supervision of GTIS.

The Campus 
The campus comprises four institutes namely State Institute of Design (SID), State Institute of Film and Television (SIFTV), State Institute of Fine Arts (SIFA) and State Institute of Urban Planning and Architecture (SIUPA).
These institutes are modelled on the lines of respective apex institutes of national importance. The Campus is being established at a capital expenditure of Rs. 300 crore by the Government of Haryana through Government Technical Institution Society, Rohtak. Each of the four individual institutes is provided with separate institute building and common central facilities including an auditorium, art gallery, knowledge centre and a cafeteria. The campus is designed by internationally renowned architect Raj Rewal and M/s RITES (A Government of India Enterprise) is the project management consultant.

Admission process 

10+2 examination passed or appearing under recognised Central/State Board of Secondary
Education/Council for Indian School of Certificate Examination, New Delhi with English & Math as compulsory subjects. As per COA norms, the minimum 10+2 aggregate percentage should be 50% or more. Or 3 years diploma recognised by AICTE or State Board of Technical Education (minimum 50% marks) with valid NATA score.

Students achievements

Study tour 
Study tour of SIUPA students to Ahmedabad was conducted in the year 2012. The Students during the tour
visited Sabarmati Ashram, Hussain Doshi Gufa, Bhadra Fort, Teen Darwaza, Akshardham Temple, Hathee
Singh Temple, Jama Masjid, Indian Institute of Management and National Institute of Design.
Study tour of SIUPA students to Chandigarh was conducted in the year 2013 to enlighten them with
Architectural and Planning aspects of the India's first planned city.

The Faculty 
 Dr Seema, Head of Department 
 Ar. Shalini Sheoran
 Ar. Himanshu Phogat
 Ar. Deepika Sangroha
 Ar. Nidhi Malik
 Ar. Sahil Pahal
 Ar. Ajaybahu Joshi
 Ar. Pardeep Kumar
 Ar. Supri Maheshwari
 Ar. Vijaya Prakash Singh
 Ar. Pradeep Kumar Attri
 Er. Vikas 
 Planner Vaishali
 Ar. Meet Fatewar (ex-employee)
 Ar. Shruti Gautam

Members of Academic Council

See also
 State Institute of Film and Television

References

External links
 Official website

Architecture schools in India
Universities and colleges in Haryana
Education in Rohtak
Educational institutions established in 2012
2012 establishments in Haryana
Urban planning in India